Kikutani is a Japanese surname. Notable people with the surname include:

, Japanese rugby union player
, Japanese swimmer

Japanese-language surnames